Mark Jankovics (born 5 April 1956) is an Australian former soccer player who played as a striker.

Career

Jankovics started his career with Australian top flight side Saints. Before the 1978 season, he signed for Marconi Stallions in the Australian top flight, helping them win their first league title and the 1980 NSL Cup.

References

External links
 

1956 births
Association football forwards
Australia international soccer players
Australian soccer players
Living people
Marconi Stallions FC players
National Soccer League (Australia) players
St George FC players